Evanukku Engeyo Matcham Irukku is a 2018 Indian Tamil-language adult comedy film directed by Mukesh and produced by Sharmiela Mandre. The film stars Vimal and Ashna Zaveri, with Singampuli, Anandaraj, Poorna, and Mansoor Ali Khan in supporting roles. The music was composed by Natarajan Sankaran with cinematography by Gopi Jagadeeswaran and editing by P. Dinesh. A remake of the Telugu film Guntur Talkies (2016), the film was released on 7 December 2018 to mixed reviews and become an average grosser.

Plot
Hari (Vimal) and Giri (Singampuli) are colleagues who work together in a pharmacy. In the night, they become robbers but steal only petty things. However, they land in trouble by going beyond their limits. Soon, both  partners in crime gets chased by a cop named SI Geetha (Poorna), a gangster named Annachi (Anandaraj), and a horny NRI (Miya Rai) who wants Hari. Above all, the family of Hari's lover Surekha (Ashna Zaveri) also wants to wallop him. The rest of the film is all about how both Hari and Giri come out of all the trouble.

Cast

Production
A remake of the Telugu adult crime comedy Guntur Talkies (2016), the film was picked up by Kannada actress Sharmiela Mandre, who wanted to produce the film as a display of gratitude for director Mukesh, who had introduced her as an actress with Sajni (2007). Vimal and Ashna Zaveri were signed on to play lead characters, with the story edited to cater it to the Tamil audiences. The team originally considered Rashmi Gautam, who was part of the original, for a role but she was ultimately left out. Poorna was also cast in the film as a police officer.

The film was partially shot in London during mid-2018, where scenes featuring Vimal, Ashna and British-Punjabi actress Mahi Sarna were shot. The rest of the film was shot in Chennai and Theni.

Soundtrack 
The soundtrack was composed by Natarajan Sankaran.

"Evanukku Engeyo" – Sharanya Gopinath
"O Surekha" – M. M. Manasi
"Pazhaya Pattu" – Santhosh Hariharan, Natarajan Sankaran
"Alai Alai" – Deepak, Keerthana
"Mogam Chinna" – Padmalatha
"Ye Pulli" – Jagadish

Critical reception
Times of India rated 2 out of 5 "..being an unabashed adult comedy. The adult part of it, [..] is problematic... [..] but because of the sloppy writing." Cinema Express called it "offensive, disastrous attempt at an adult comedy".

References

2018 films
2010s Tamil-language films
2010s sex comedy films
2018 black comedy films
Indian sex comedy films
Indian black comedy films
Films shot in Chennai
Films shot in London
Tamil remakes of Telugu films